Zamzam (Zemzem, formerly Zamzam Cola) is a brand of soft drink produced in Iran by Zamzam Group. It is popular in parts of the West Asia, having gained a status there as an alternative to Coca-Cola and Pepsi. The director of the Zamzam Group is Ahmad-Haddad Moghaddam. Zamzam Group is owned by the Mostazafan Foundation.

History
Originally a subsidiary of Pepsi created in Iran in 1954 as the first Iranian carbonated soft drink producer owned by Habib Sabet. Following Islamic revolution in 1979, the company was taken from his original owner without compensation and the named was changed to ZamZam. 

Following the 2002 boycott of Coca-Cola by Saudi Arabia, Zamzam was unofficially dubbed the soft drink of the Hajj.

The product's name is a reference to the Well of Zamzam in Mecca, that is one of the stops on the Islamic pilgrimage of the Hajj.

The  headquarters of Zamzam are in Tehran, Iran. The bottling facility in Tehran is a popular attraction where people can see the drink being bottled.

The production was at first a single production line, and now it owns seventeen beverage plants in Iran as well as several international companies, which produce and distribute Zamzam products under its licence. Zamzam Group has developed the most well equipped beverage concentrate plant in the West Asia. Zamzam Group had significant presence in domestic and international markets, and produces over one hundred diverse products including cola, lemon, orange, lemonade, mango, mineral water, energy drink, and non-alcoholic malt beverage. Zamzam is also available in the United Arab Emirates and other surrounding nations.

References

External links

Zam Zam Foods North America Inc, distributors in the United States and Canada.
"Cola wars as Islam shuns the real thing", article from The Times, October 11, 2002.
Islamic cola 'selling well in Saudi' BBC News - August 21, 2002

Cola brands
Iranian brands
Iranian drinks
Food and drink companies of Iran